Elisabetta Perrone (born 9 July 1968) is a former race walker from Italy who won eighteen medals, eight of these at senior level, at the International athletics competitions.

Biography
Elisabetta Perrone won six medals, at individual level, at the International athletics competitions. She participated at four editions of the Summer Olympics (1992, 1996, 2000, 2004), she has 39 caps in sixteen years in national team from 1981 to 2004.

National records
 20 km race walk: 1:27:09 ( Dudince, 19 May 2001). Record held until 17 May 2015 (broken by Eleonora Giorgi with 1:26:17)
 5000 m race walk: 20:12.24 ( Rieti, 2 August 2003). Record held until 18 May 2014 (broken by Eleonora Giorgi with 20.01.80)

Achievements

National titles
Perrone won 9 national championships at individual senior level.
Italian Athletics Championships
5000 m walk (track): 1994, 1996, 1997, 2003 (4)
10,000 m walk (track): 1994, 1995 (2)
20 km: 2001 (1)
Italian Athletics Indoor Championships
3000 m walk: 1998, 2003 (2)

See also
 Italy at the European Race Walking Cup - Multiple medalists
 Italian all-time lists - 20 km walk

References

External links
 
 

1968 births
Living people
Italian female racewalkers
Athletes (track and field) at the 1992 Summer Olympics
Athletes (track and field) at the 1996 Summer Olympics
Athletes (track and field) at the 2000 Summer Olympics
Athletes (track and field) at the 2004 Summer Olympics
Olympic athletes of Italy
Sportspeople from the Province of Biella
Olympic silver medalists for Italy
Athletics competitors of Gruppo Sportivo Forestale
World Athletics Championships medalists
People from Vercelli
World Athletics Championships athletes for Italy
Medalists at the 1996 Summer Olympics
Olympic silver medalists in athletics (track and field)
Mediterranean Games gold medalists for Italy
Mediterranean Games silver medalists for Italy
Mediterranean Games medalists in athletics
Athletes (track and field) at the 1997 Mediterranean Games
Athletes (track and field) at the 2001 Mediterranean Games
Sportspeople from the Province of Vercelli